City Bureau is an American  non-profit organization based in South Side of Chicago, Illinois. It is a non-profit newsroom that aims to produce civic journalism that brings journalists and communities together in a collaborative spirit. It was founded in 2015, and soon after won the March 2016 Sidney Award. City Bureau has since won awards from the Online Journalism Awards for their Documenters.org project, a $1M grant from the MacArthur Foundation, and trained over 80 journalists, held numerous public meetings, and co-published articles with numerous outlets.

History 
City Bureau was founded in October 2015 by local Chicagoans Bettina Chang, Andrea Hart, Darryl Holliday, Harry Backlund. Its goal was to help address the lack of news coverage of Chicago's South and West Sides as well as the lack of diversity in newsrooms. It received early grants from Illinois Humanities and the McCormick Foundation and in 2018 was awarded a $1M grant from the MacArthur Foundation.

Notable Projects

Documenters 
Through the Documenters program, City Bureau trains and pays community members to attend local government meetings and report back on them. As of October 2019, over 1000 people had enrolled in the program. In conjunction, City Bureau has helped to develop a City Scrapers toolkit, an open-source tool for gathering and standardizing information about all of the different public meetings in a city. The program has also expanded beyond Chicago with a pilot program in Detroit.

Police Accountability 
Much of City Bureau's early reporting and community outreach focused on police accountability. They co-published stories with newspapers including The Guardian and the Chicago Reader about misinformation in the aftermath of police shootings. The latter article focused on the role that the Chicago Fraternal Order of Police played in shaping the narrative around shootings involving members of the Chicago Police Department and won a Sidney Award for outstanding investigative journalism. As an example of their efforts to better engage local communities, when the Chicago Police Accountability Task Force published their lengthy report following the murder of Laquan McDonald, City Bureau and several Documenters partnered with the Invisible Institute and Smart Chicago Collaborative to generate an annotated version of the report that readers could then contribute their own stories overtop.

References 

501(c)(3) organizations
Non-profit organizations based in Chicago
Nonprofit newspapers